William Sproule (1858 – January 1, 1935) was president of the Wells Fargo Express Company and later the Southern Pacific Railroad.

References

1858 births
1935 deaths
Southern Pacific Railroad